Chamdampet is a village in Nalgonda district of the Indian state of Telangana. It is located in Chandampet mandal of Devarakonda division.

References

Mandal headquarters in Nalgonda district